This is a list of assassinated serving ambassadors.

List

References

Bibliography

Ambassadors
Ambassadors